Apion is a genus of beetles belonging to the family Brentidae. The genus was first described in 1797 by Johann Friedrich Wilhelm Herbst.

Species
Species found in Australia include:

 

Additional species listed by GBIF include:

References

Brentidae